Ozolinone is a loop diuretic which was never marketed.

It is an active metabolite of etozoline.

See also 
 Etozoline — a prodrug of ozolinone

References 

Carboxylic acids
Loop diuretics
1-Piperidinyl compounds
Thiazolidines
Abandoned drugs